Alex Gene Morrison is a contemporary painter and video/animator born in Birmingham in 1975. He studied painting at the Royal College of Art between 2000 and 2002.

He had a solo show at Stella Vine's Gallery Rosy Wilde in 2004. He has had solo shows at Rockwell Gallery, London, in 2006 at The Fishmarket Gallery, Northampton, in 2007, Chapter Arts Centre, Cardiff, in 2008 and Charlie Smith Gallery, London, in 2010. His painting was exhibited in the John Moores Painting Prize in Liverpool in 2009. Morrison's work has been shown internationally.

References

External links
BBC
ArtRabbit
Viatico
City & Guilds of London Art School
a-n Magazine
Culture24

1975 births
20th-century English painters
English male painters
21st-century English painters
Living people
20th-century English male artists
21st-century English male artists